The 2004 Salford City Council election took place on 10 June 2004 to elect members of Salford City Council in England. The whole council was up for election with boundary changes having taken place since the last election in 2003. The Labour Party kept overall control of the council. Overall turnout was 35.53%.

Election result

|}

Ward results

Barton

Boothstown and Ellenbrook

Broughton

Cadishead

Claremont

Eccles

Irlam

Irlam Riverside

Kersal

Langworthy

Little Hulton

Ordsall

Pendlebury

Swinton North

Swinton South

Walkden North

Walkden South

Weaste & Seedley

Winton

Worsley

References

2004
2004 English local elections
2000s in Greater Manchester